Gerald Richard Barnes (born June 22, 1945) is an American prelate of the Roman Catholic Church who served as bishop of the Diocese of San Bernardino in California from 1996 to 2020 and as an auxiliary bishop of the Diocese of San Bernardino from 1992 to 1996.

Biography
Gerald Barnes was born on June 22, 1945, in Phoenix, Arizona, to George and Aurora Barnes. In 1946, the family moved to the Boyle Heights area of Los Angeles  The family opened a grocery store, where he and his siblings worked in their spare time. Barnes attended public schools for his primary education, then graduated from Theodore Roosevelt High School in Los Angeles.

Barnes entered California State University, Los Angeles, graduating in 1967 with a Bachelor of Political Science degree.  He then attended seminaries in St. Louis, Missouri, Dayton, Ohio and Assumption Seminary in San Antonio, Texas.

Priesthood 
On December 20, 1975, Barnes was ordained to the priesthood for the Archdiocese of San Antonio by Archbishop Francis Furey.  In 1989, he was named by the Vatican as an honorary prelate with the title of monsignor  He also served as rector of Assumption Seminary.

Auxiliary Bishop of San Bernardino
On January 28, 1992, Pope John Paul II appointed Barnes as the first auxiliary bishop of the diocese of San Bernardino and titular bishop of Montefiascone.  He was consecrated on March 18, 1992, by Bishop Philip Straling, with Archbishop Patrick Flores and Bishop Curtis Guillory serving as co-consecrators. Barnes selected as his episcopal motto: "Amar Es Entregarse", Spanish for "Love is a total gift of self". 

With the installation of Bishop Straling as bishop of the Diocese of Reno in June 1995, the Vatican named Barnes as the apostolic administrator of the Diocese of San Bernardino.

Bishop of San Bernardino 
On December 28, 1995, John Paul II appointed Barnes as the second bishop of the Diocese of San Bernardino.  He was installed on March 12, 1996. In his episcopal ministry, Barnes established the 4 Core Values and explained the diocesan vision.  

Within the United States Conference of Catholic Bishops (USCCB), Barnes chaired the Committee on Migration and Refugee Services. In that post, he described the "current immigration system" as responsible for "family separation, suffering, and even death" and "is morally unacceptable and must be reformed". He chaired the Committee on Hispanic Affairs from 1996 to 1999.

Under Barnes, the diocese operated three high schools, twenty-three elementary schools and three pre-schools. In 2001, Barnes inaugurated the Annual Bishop's Golf Classic to fund scholarships to families who are unable to afford a Catholic education for their children. During his tenure, Barnes closed four primary schools in the California communities of Barstow, Banning, Apple Valley and San Bernardino. The high desert portion of the diocese has no Catholic schools 

On April 3, 2003, the Diocese of San Bernardino filed a lawsuit against the Archdiocese of Boston.  The diocese charged that the archdiocese gave them false information on Paul R. Shanley, a priest who transferred to the diocese from Boston in 1990.  Despite Shanley having a record of sexual abuse of minors in Massachusetts, the archdiocese described him to the diocese as "a priest in good standing.  Later in 1990, Shanley was accused of abusing a teenager at a hotel in Palm Springs, California. On July 6, 2003, after speaking to the new archbishop of Boston, Sean O'Malley, Barnes decided to drop the lawsuit.

In 2007, the Government of Mexico presented Barnes with the Ohtli award for his service to Mexican citizens living in the United States.In March 2014, Barnes, citing economic benefits and good citizenship, encouraged parishioners in the diocese without health insurance to sign up for Obamacare.

Retirement 
On June 22, 2020, his 75th birthday, Barnes submitted his letter of resignation as the Bishop of the Diocese of San Bernardino to Pope Francis.  The Pope accepted it on December 28, 2020, at which point Coadjutor Bishop Alberto Rojas succeeded automatically to the office.

See also

 Catholic Church hierarchy
 Catholic Church in the United States
 Historical list of the Catholic bishops of the United States
 List of Catholic bishops of the United States
 Lists of patriarchs, archbishops, and bishops

References

External links
Diocese of San Bernardino

1945 births
Living people
Religious leaders from Phoenix, Arizona
Roman Catholic Diocese of San Bernardino
Religious leaders from California
20th-century Roman Catholic bishops in the United States
21st-century Roman Catholic bishops in the United States
Ohtli Award winners